The Widnes Vikings are an English rugby league club in Widnes, Cheshire, which competes in the Betfred Championship. The club plays home matches at the Halton Stadium. Founded as Widnes Football Club, they are one of the original twenty-two rugby clubs that formed the Northern Rugby Football Union in 1895. Their historic nickname is "The Chemics" after the main industry in Widnes, but now they use their modern nickname, "The Vikings".

The club enjoyed a period of success in the 1970s, 1980s, and early 1990s, and were frequently described as "Cup Kings" reaching the Challenge Cup Final 7 times in 10 years between 1975 and 1984. In 1989, after winning their third Rugby League Premiership, Widnes became the first official World Club Champions by beating the Australian champions Canberra Raiders 30–18 at Old Trafford. They have a strong local rivalry with Warrington Wolves.

History

Early years

The Farnworth & Appleton Cricket Club was formed in 1871 and four years later the members decided to embrace the burgeoning football code. At their fourth annual evening party in the Drill Hall, Widnes, in November 1875, club Chairman Henry Lea "gave a short account of the club since it commenced about four years ago, and indicated that they had now started a football club in connexion (sic) with it, and hoped all would join". The first known game for the new Farnworth and Appleton FC was in Widnes in January 1876 played under rugby rules against Northwich Victoria. A few weeks later a return match was played at Drill Field, Northwich under soccer rules. Vics won both games. These are the only two known fixtures in that truncated first season.

By May 1876 the club had changed its name to Widnes FC and the cricket side of the organisation had disbanded, presumably to concentrate on football activities. By the late 1870s the club was being referred to as "The Chemicals"—subsequently shortened to 'The Chemics'.

The first ground was on Albert Road behind what is now the Premier Wetherspoon's pub and a short spell followed in the Simms Cross area. From around 1878–84 the club were based at the junction of Millfield/Peelhouse Lane, apart from season 1880–81 when they played on the Widnes Cricket Club ground at Lowerhouse Lane. From 1884–95 they rented a field at Lowerhouse Lane before moving to their third separate site on that road in October 1895. The first ever game at what later became Naughton Park was against Liversedge on Saturday 12 October 1895.

In 1895, Widnes were founder members of the Northern Union which broke away from the Rugby Football Union. Their first game was an away fixture against Runcorn which they lost 15–4. During the early years, the club often had to sell players to balance the books. The strength of junior rugby league in the area meant the club had a steady stream of new players to offset any losses.

In 1902, the Lancashire and Yorkshire leagues were combined to form a second division, Widnes was added to the first division.

In 1914, Arthur 'Chick' Johnson was capped for the Lions (captained by Harold Wagstaff) in the famous Rorke's Drift test, a match in which they overcame all the odds, and injuries to beat Australia with a depleted side of 10 against 13. He scored an extraordinary try to win the game, dribbling the ball from inside his own half. Widnes closed for the 1915–16 season but recommenced playing in 1916 following the introduction of conscription which meant that would not be accused of keeping men from volunteering for the First World War. Thirteen Widnes players were killed during the conflict.

The club's first ever success came when they won the Lancashire League trophy in the 1919–20 season. However, the 1920s saw the club almost go to the wall. Local rivals Warrington donated their share of the traditional Easter and Christmas derby matches to keep Widnes afloat in 1927–28.

In 1930, Widnes with 12 local-born players defied the odds to beat St. Helens 10–3 to bring home the Challenge Cup.

The Kingsway housing scheme threatened the loss of Widnes' ground. After several years of fundraising during the Great Depression of the 1930s, £3,250 was raised to save the ground. This came with a stipulation that the ground could be sold only to the local council at the original price. The newly named Naughton Park was opened in 1932.

A major boost for the club was Widnes' first ever trip to the Challenge Cup final, staged at Wembley. Their opponents were St. Helens, Saints scored after six minutes to take a 3–0 lead, but Widnes hit back with a penalty try, a further try and a penalty to take a 10–3 half-time lead. A scoreless second half meant Widnes had won the cup.

Widnes became the first club to make two trips to Wembley, with a loss to Hunslet in the 1934 cup final.

In 1935–36, the team came close to being rugby league champions. Having finished third in the table, Widnes beat Liverpool 10–9 but lost to Hull FC, in the championship final. A third trip to Wembley came in 1937, with an 18–5 win over Keighley. The final was dubbed "McCue's Match" as the halfback played an important part in the win.

Widnes dropped out of the wartime Lancashire league in 1940–41 and did not return to league competition until 1945–46.

Post war

Tommy McCue led the club to its first ever Lancashire County Cup win, with a 7–3 victory against Wigan in 1945.

Back at Wembley in 1950, the team was beaten 19–0 by Warrington. During this period, the club reverted to selling its players to richer teams.

Local man Vince Karalius joined Widnes from St. Helens in 1962 and was appointed club captain. In his first season, Widnes finished third in the Championship, which equalled the club's best league placing. In 1962, the league was split into East and West of the Pennines; Widnes and Workington Town met at Central Park, Wigan, in the first final of the Western Division Championship on Saturday 10 November 1962. With two minutes remaining, Lowdon dropped a goal to earn Workington a 9–9 draw. Later in the month Workington Town won the replay 10–0.

The following season saw him lead his team to Wembley, where Widnes were Rugby League Challenge Cup winners after they defeated Hull Kingston Rovers 13–5. No team had ever played more games in reaching Wembley than Widnes in 1964. In the first round, two replays were necessary before beating Leigh. Liverpool City were beaten in the second round, then Widnes played Swinton in front of 19,000 at Naughton Park. A 5–5 draw meant another replay, which was a scoreless draw at Station Road. A second replay at Wigan was watched by 21,369 with Widnes winning 15–3. The semi-final against Castleford was drawn 7–7. A crowd of 28,732 spectators watched the replay, which Widnes won. A Wembley crowd of 84,488 saw Widnes win the Challenge Cup for the third time with a 13–5 victory over Hull Kingston Rovers. This was the Chemics first trophy success in eighteen years.The "Cup Kings"
The 1970s saw the first really outstanding Widnes team. A host of young local players developed into the "Cup Kings", a golden age for the club. The first cup-final was a loss in the 1971–72 Lancashire County Cup.

Six years after he retired from playing Vince Karalius returned to Widnes as coach; appointed in January 1972. The following two seasons, Widnes reached the finals of the BBC2 Floodlit Trophy. The first success came in the 1975 Lancashire Cup which Widnes won by beating Salford that season. They also won the 1975 Challenge Cup final 14–7 versus Warrington at Wembley. This was the first time in their history that Widnes had won two trophies in the same season. At his zenith, Karalius, stepped down once from his role as coach. He was replaced in May 1975 by Frank Myler.

Widnes visited Wembley in the following two seasons, losing to St. Helens and then Leeds. However, this was made up for by victories in the Lancashire County Cup and John Player Trophy. The season after this (1977–78) saw their first league championship. The team went through the season unbeaten at home in the league. There were also trips to the John Player and Premiership finals.

Keith Elwell began his run of 242 consecutive appearances at Wembley in the 1976–77 Challenge Cup Final, including two as a substitute. He finished his run at Hull F.C. on 26 September 1982. This record for consecutive appearances for one club stands to this day.

Doug Laughton took over the job of team coach when Frank Myler retired from the position in 1978. The 1978–79 season saw no less than four cups come to Widnes—the BBC2 floodlit trophy, Lancashire Cup, Premiership and a win at Wembley over Wakefield Trinity in front of a crowd of 93,218. Widnes also defeated the Ashes-winning 1978 Kangaroo tourists.

The 1979–80 season saw Widnes beat Bradford Northern in the Premiership final, but come second to them in the league and John Player Trophy. The Lancashire Cup was won for the fifth time in the 1970s.

The 1980s started with a Wembley win over Hull Kingston Rovers in 1980–81. The season after this, Widnes again returned to Wembley, to face Hull F.C. Widnes led 14–6 with less than 20 minutes to go, but the game finished 14–14 and Hull won the replay 18–9 at Elland Road, Leeds. Widnes kept their record of winning a cup every season by defeating Hull 23–8 in the Premiership final. The next season saw Hull again beaten by Widnes in the Premiership final.

Vince Karalius returned to the club in March 1983 as co-coach with Harry Dawson. Dawson quit as coach in March 1984 with Karalius continuing as team manager. Karalius led a strong Widnes side to the finals of the Lancashire Cup and John Player Trophy and another Wembley victory appearance 19–6 against Wigan.

Doug Laughton returned to the club in January 1986 and began a series of signings of players from other league clubs and from rugby union. One such player was Martin Offiah, who in 1987–88 scored a club record 42 tries. The team went on to win the championship that season, clinching it with a 50-point win away over Hunslet. Widnes then beat St. Helens in the Premiership Final at Old Trafford, Manchester a game in which Alan Tait made his début.

The 1988–89 season saw the club sign rugby union star Jonathan Davies from Llanelli for £225,000. Wigan were beaten in the Charity Shield but had their revenge in the Regal Trophy Final. The Championship came down to the last game of the season, a capacity crowd at Naughton Park saw Widnes beat Wigan 32–18 to win the title for the second year running. The Premiership was won again, with over 40,000 at Old Trafford to see Widnes beat Hull 18–10.

The 1989–90 season saw Widnes play at Anfield, Liverpool beating Wigan 27–22. A trip to France to play Le Pontet saw Widnes chosen as the Northern Hemisphere representatives to meet Australia's Grand Final winners. Canberra took a 12–0 lead but were then swept aside as Widnes stormed home 30–18 to become the first official World Club Champions.

However, financial problems riddled the club in the early 1990s. To balance the books, over 25 first team players were sold to other teams. This resulted in the club sinking to 12th in the division one table, avoiding relegation.

Myler became coach of Widnes in May 1994. In August 1995 the club decided to bring back Doug Laughton for a third stint as team manager which resulted in Myler's sacking as coach.

Summer era
In 1996, the first tier of British rugby league clubs played the inaugural Super League season and changed from a winter to a summer season. When the RFL announced that a new 12-team Super League was to be formed a chaotic period ensued in which the club was out, then in, then out, then in merged with local rivals Warrington and then finally out again as they finished below the cut-off point of 10th in the existing top flight.

The club adopted the name Widnes Vikings'' on 27 November 1996; the club had originally intended to adopt the moniker 'Warriors' but were asked to reconsider by the RFL, as Whitehaven were planning to adopt this name also. Further player and coaching departures ensued and the club struggled in the new first division, the club's first ever finish in the relegation zone followed. They spent the next five years in the Northern Ford Premiership.

Graeme West took over as coach after Doug Laughton's third stint, his reign lasted from May 1997 until August 1998. During this time, the playing arena was rebuilt and the old stands, terraces and facilities were demolished to be replaced with a state-of-the-art all-seater stadium and was also renamed from Naughton Park to the Halton Community Stadium. West was later replaced as coach by Colin Whitfield.

In 1999 Widnes narrowly missed out on a place in the Northern Ford Premiership Grand Final. The 2000 season was one of transition with head coach Colin Whitfield being sacked and replaced by David Hulme. A record attendance for the newly rebuilt stadium was set at 6,644 for a Northern Ford Premiership game against Leigh on Boxing Day 2000. Widnes finished off a poor season in 8th place in the NFP.

Under new coach Neil Kelly, Widnes won promotion to Super League in 2001 after beating Oldham 24–12 in the Northern Ford Premiership Grand Final.

Their début season in the Super League was in 2002, and the Vikings surprised everyone by narrowly missing out on a play-off place, and finishing seventh.

The following season saw them consolidate with a 9th place finish, and in 2004 they avoided relegation on the final day of the season, with Castleford's defeat by Wakefield Trinity saving Widnes' fate. Stuart Spruce was caretaker manager.

Frank Endacott arrived at Widnes as coach in 2005, but could not improve on the previous seasons. With two teams being relegated in 2005, due to the inclusion of Catalans Dragons in Superleague from 2006 onwards, Widnes were relegated back down to the second tier of the English game (LHF National League 1).

Widnes parted company with coach Frank Endacott, and new coach Steve McCormack rebuilt the squad, which notably included Australian full back David Peachey, who kept his word to join the club, despite its relegation.

Stephen Vaughan completed a take-over of Widnes in 2006 and the club made it to the LHF National League Grand Final, but were beaten 29–16 by Hull Kingston Rovers at Warrington's Halliwell Jones Stadium.

Stephen Vaughan quit as chairman of Widnes at the start of 2007 and stepped down from the club's board of directors, placing the club's season into a 'boom or bust' scenario. Widnes won the 2007 Northern Rail Cup Final with a 54–6 victory over Whitehaven at Bloomfield Road stadium and went on to reach the National League Grand Final at the end of the season. They were beaten 42–10 by Castleford at Headingley and in the days that followed, Widnes had no option but to place themselves into voluntary administration.

New beginning
On 2 November 2007, Widnes were purchased by Steve O'Connor, a local business man who had just sold his haulage firm to the Stobart Group. Steve McCormack was re-appointed as Head Coach, and the club were re-admitted into National League 1. A nine-point deduction for going into administration was successfully neutralised through winning their first three games, and Widnes qualified for the National League One Playoffs by finishing in sixth place. A 32–16 defeat by third-placed Halifax however brought the nostalgic 2008 campaign to an end.

Off the field, Widnes had applied for a Super League licence for the 2009 season along with 18 other clubs. However, the club was not granted a licence to play in the Super League, with the recent financial history of the club coming under close scrutiny.

In 2009 Widnes parted company with Steve McCormack and for a period John Stankevitch became caretaker manager. Paul Cullen was unveiled as McCormack's eventual successor and managed the club to victory in the seasons Northern Rail Cup Final, beating a strong Barrow Raiders side 34–18.

In the following season, Widnes again reached the Northern Rail Cup Final but were beaten 25–24 by Batley Bulldogs. The club also reached the 2010 Co-operative Championship playoffs but were knocked out in the opening round by Barrow Raiders.

Return to Super League
In 2011 Widnes were granted a Super League licence for the 2012–14 seasons and Denis Betts was confirmed as the man who would coach the club. A flourish of new signings were announced and the pioneering 'Viking Stronghold' initiative moved from strength to strength. Widnes also installed a fourth generation artificial pitch (or ipitch as it became known) during the off season, making them the first team in modern day rugby league to not play on a traditional grass pitch. Widnes' tenancy in the Co-operative Championship culminated in September 2011 with a fifth place league finish, and a first round playoff defeat of 36–20 against Sheffield at Bramall Lane.

February 2012 saw Widnes' re-emergence into the top tier of rugby league, and they claimed their first two points against Wigan in a 37–36 win. The club managed to prove a number of critics wrong by gaining 12 points in total by the end of their first season back, but this was not enough to prevent the club from finishing at the bottom of the Super League table.

The 2013 season saw a marked improvement on the field by Widnes, with the team earning a total of 22 league points and finishing 10th in the Super League table.

The 2014 season proved to be the most successful season of the franchise period, with the club finishing eighth in the Super League table on 27 points and subsequently qualifying for the end of season play-offs for the first time in their history. A 22–19 away defeat by the Warrington Wolves brought the curtain down on a season that can only be seen as a success for the Vikings, with a Challenge Cup Semi-Final appearance against the Castleford being the key highlight. However, it was also during the 2014 season that the club received the news that "legendary supporter" Pat Price had died and condolences for 'the first lady of Rugby League' were received from clubs and supporters throughout the sport.

The RFL overhauled Super League for the 2015 season, scrapping the Franchise System and re-adopted promotion & relegation. Widnes finished in 9th position on 19 points, and then went on to consolidate their Super League status in the Middle 8's.

The 2016 season saw the Vikings put together a number of early exciting performances, including defeating the previous season's champions Leeds 56–12. This placed Widnes top of the Super League table, heading into the Easter fixtures. Before the start of the 2017, Widnes sold their inspirational captain and best player to their bitter rivals Warrington. This move was completed whilst Brown was still in contract and despite warnings from fans, this proved the beginning of the end for Widnes as a potential mid table team.

In 2017, the team finished bottom but avoided relegation by beating the Catalans Dragons and the Million Pound Game.
The lack of ambition of the club was now available for everybody to see with Chairman Steven O’Connor washing his hands of the club and moving to Australia in order to pursue further business projects. This was done without O’Connor fulfilling his promise to the club and town that the club would not be entering Super League to “Make up the numbers”. The current board headed by James Rule failed to heed the mistakes of the 2017 season and further recruitment to the squad was extremely poor. This lack of ambition and value for money resulted in fans walking away from the club in their droves.

Relegation and financial problems
The 2018 season continued as the previous one with few quality signings and a team no longer good enough to compete in Super League. The club lost nineteen games in a row, which led to coach Denis Betts being dismissed with Francis Cummins taking interim charge; however, he could not prevent the club from falling into the Championship. On 1 February 2019, CEO James Rule resigned because the club faced significant financial challenges as a result of relegation. Speculation about the future of the club began to mount following a significant silence by the club's then chairman, Steve O’Connor.

The club went into administration on 22 February 2019 after a take-over bid failed; as a result of this development the Rugby Football League imposed a 12-point penalty on the club and their upcoming game against Sheffield was postponed. Following a fundraising campaign called "Vikings Quids In", supported by fans and other rugby league clubs, over £100,000 was raised. On 1 March 2019, the RFL accepted a takeover by a seven-strong consortium registered as Widnes Rugby League Club Limited, however the 12 point deduction remained in place leaving the club on minus 8 points. An investigation has begun to establish where large amounts of sponsorship and other funds have gone whilst the previous board were in charge. This may result in criminal proceedings against those responsible if any wrongdoing is
discovered.

Vikings Resurgence
In March 2019, the club narrowly escaped liquidation, thanks in large part to crowdfunding pages setup by the remaining Widnes Vikings fans. Newly appointed Head Coach Kieron Purtill began leading the club in a moderately successful streak of wins, culminating in reaching the finals of the 2019 RFL 1895 Cup against Sheffield Eagles. In the 2022 RFL Championship season, Widnes finished seventh on the table and missed the playoffs.

Grounds

The club's home ground is Halton Stadium. The club had a number of grounds before settling at Lowerhouse Lane in 1895. The death of the club's secretary, Tom Naughton in 1932, led to the ground on Lowerhouse Lane being renamed Naughton Park as a gesture of the team's appreciation. Naughton Park became one of the best known Rugby League grounds in the country due to the success of the 'Chemics' in the 1970s, and 1980s. In the 1990s Halton Council in partnership with the Widnes agreed to build a new stadium on the existing site, which would provide a multi-purpose complex including a social club, conference facilities, recreational facilities and catering/function facilities and would be the new home venue for Widnes RLFC. The new stadium was officially opened on 2 November 1997 following the completion of phase 1 of a multimillion-pound redevelopment and was renamed the Halton Community Stadium. On 29 January 1999 Halton Borough Council took over responsibility for the entire stadium, both financially and managerially. This was necessary as the joint venture companies arrangements were not performing as expected. The stadium reached completion with the opening of the East Stand in September 2005 and is an all-seater stadium which has a capacity of 13,500. It has also had the honour to have staged national finals and international fixtures. In August 2011, the stadium turf was removed and replaced with a third generation artificial pitch (or ipitch as it became known), in order to improve overall match performance and maximize the use of the club's facilities. The stadium's name has changed a number of times due to sponsorship purposes, with the latest name being the DCBL Stadium.

Club jerseys
 Since promotion to Super League in 2002

Historic Jerseys
Prior to the over-commercialization of the sport and the changing of kit design on a yearly basis, Widnes traditionally wore a black and white hooped jersey with white shorts. However, throughout their most dominant period of the 1970s, the club actually wore an all white jersey with 3/4 length sleeves and black shorts. It is quite common for fans to desire the club to return to one of these two jerseys. In addition, historically the club played in red when away from home.

2022 squad

2023 transfers

Gains

Losses

Players

Club captains

Coaches

Coaching register – since 1972

 Vince Karalius (Jan 1972 – May 1975)
 Frank Myler (May 1975 – May 1978)
 Doug Laughton (May 1978 – Mar 1983)
 Harry Dawson & Colin Tyrer (Mar 1983 – May 1983)
 Vince Karalius & Harry Dawson(May 1983 – May 1984)
 Eric Hughes (Jun 1984 – Jan 1986)
 Doug Laughton (Jan 1986 – May 1991)
 Frank Myler (Jun 1991 – May 1992)
 Phil Larder (May 1992 – May 1994)
 Tony Myler (May 1994 – Aug 1995)
 Doug Laughton (Aug 1995 – Aug 1996)
 Bernard Long (Aug 1996 – May 1997)
 Graeme West (May 1997 – Aug 1998)
 Colin Whitfield (Aug 1998 – Mar 2000)
 David Hulme (Mar 2000 – Mar 2001)
 Neil Kelly (Mar 2001 – Jul 2004)
 Stuart Spruce (Jul 2004 – Oct 2004)
 Frank Endacott (Oct 2004 – Oct 2005)
 Steve McCormack (Oct 2005 – Feb 2009)
 John Stankevitch (Feb 2009 – Mar 2009)
 Paul Cullen (Mar 2009 – Nov 2010)
 Denis Betts (Nov 2010 – May 2018)
 Francis Cummins (May 2018 – Oct 2018)
 Keiron Purtill (Nov 2018 – Oct 2019)
 Tim Sheens (Oct 2019 – Oct 2020)
 Simon Finnigan (Nov 2020 – Apr 2022)
 Ryan O'Brien (interim) (Apr 2022 – Jun 2022)
 John Kear (Jul 2022 - present)

Seasons

Super League era

Honours

League
First Division / Super League
Winners (3): 1977–78, 1987–88, 1988–89
Premiership
Winners (6): 1979–80, 1981–82, 1982–83, 1987–88, 1988–89, 1989–90
RFL Lancashire League
Winners (1): 1919–20

Cups
Challenge Cup
Winners (7): 1929–30, 1936–37, 1963–64, 1974–75, 1978–79, 1980–81, 1983–84
League Cup
Winners (3): 1975–76, 1978–79, 1991–92
Championship Cup
Winners (2): 2007, 2009
Charity Shield
Winners (3): 1988–89, 1989–90, 1990–91
RFL Lancashire Cup
Winners (7): 1945–46, 1974–75, 1975–76, 1976–77, 1978–79, 1979–80, 1990–91
BBC2 Floodlit Trophy
Winners (1): 1978–79

International
World Club Challenge
Winners (1): 1989

Records

Player records

 Most tries in a match: 7 by Phil Cantillon vs York Wasps, 18 February 2001
 Fastest Hat trick in a match: 10 minutes by Danny Hulme vs Halifax. 21 April 2011,
 Most goals in a match: 14 by Mark Hewitt vs Oldham R.L.F.C., 25 July 1999, Tim Hartley vs Saddleworth Rangers, 7 March 2009
 Most points in a match: 38 by Gavin Dodd vs Doncaster Lakers, 10 June 2007
 Most tries in a season: 58 by Martin Offiah, 1988–89
 Most goals in a season: 161 by Mick Nanyn, 2007
 Most points in a season: 434 by Mick Nanyn, 2007
 Most career tries: 234 by Mal Aspey, 1964–80
 Most career goals: 1083 by Ray Dutton 1966–78
 Most career points: 2195 by Ray Dutton 1966–78
 Most career appearances: 587+4 by Keith Elwell 1970–86

100+ tries

234 Mal Aspey 1964–65 – 1979–80
199 Eric Hughes [Centre] 1969–70 – 1983–84
181 Martin Offiah 1987–88 – 1990–91
161 David Hulme 1980–81 – 1996 & 2000 – 2001
151 Stuart Wright 1976–77 – 1986–87
144 Frank Myler 1955–56 – 1967–68
120 John Devereux 1989–90 – 1997
119 Andy Currier 1983–84 – 1992–93 & 1997
114 Phil Cantillon 1999 – 2003
112 Dennis O'Neill 1966–67 – 1978–79
111 Johnny Gaydon 1961–62 – 1971–72
110 William Thompson 1956–57 – 1964–65
108 Derek `Mick` George 1971–72 – 1981–82
107 Darren Wright 1985–86 – 1996
106 Tommy McCue 1931–32 – 1948–49
103 John Basnett 1981–82 – 1986–87
102 William Reid 1909–10 – 1926–27
101 Jimmy Hoey 1922–23 – 1934–35

150+ goals

1072 Ray Dutton 1965–66 – 1977–78
708 Mick Burke 1978–79 – 1986–87
434 Jonathan Davies 1988–89 – 1992–93
395 Jimmy Hoey 1922–23 – 1934–35
389 Robert Randall 1960–61 – 1964–65
383 Harry Dawson 1951–52 – 1962–63
295 Mick Nanyn 2006 – 2007
243 John Myler 1976–77 – 1988–89
213 John Sale 1951–52 – 1957–58
209 Robin Whitfield 1961–62 – 1967–68
207 Arthur Pimblett 1957–58 – 1961–62
202 Mark Hewitt 1998 – 1999
201 Andy Currier 1983–84 – 1992–93 & 1997
195 Peter Topping 1927–28 – 1939–40
167 Colin Hutton 1945–46 – 1950–51
162 Harry Taylor 1908–09 – 1921–22

Team records
 Biggest victory: 90–0 vs Coventry Bears home, 21 April 2018
 Worst defeat: 76–6 vs Catalans Dragons away, 31 March 2012
 Highest attendance (Naughton Park): 24,205 vs St. Helens, 16 February 1961
 Highest attendance (all-time): 94,249 vs Warrington, 6 May 1950 (Challenge Cup Final) at Wembley Stadium
 Highest attendance vs a national touring team: 14,666 vs Australia, 18 November 1990 Kangaroo Tour

Notes

References

External links

 Official site
 Widnes RLFC History Site
 Widnes Vikings Supporters Trust forum
 Widnes Vikings forum on rlfans.com
 Championships website
 Widnes Vikings Fans Forums – RugbyLeague.org
 Stobart Stadium Halton

 
Rugby clubs established in 1875
Super League teams
1875 establishments in England
Founder members of the Northern Rugby Football Union
English rugby league teams
Rugby league teams in Cheshire
Viking Age in popular culture